Rothman Center is a multi-purpose arena in Hackensack, New Jersey. Home to the Fairleigh Dickinson University Knights men's and women's basketball, volleyball, track and field teams, as well as many other sports, it was completed in 1987 and seats 1,852.

The center hosted the Northeast Conference men's basketball tournament final in the 2004–05 and 2005-06 seasons. The center also hosts various trade shows and special events ranging from doll shows and toy soldier shows to visits by Vice President George H. W. Bush in 1988 &  former President Bill Clinton as well as former Vice President Al Gore. On October 21, 2009 the Rothman Center was visited by President Barack Obama. President Obama visited the Rothman Center to rally for former Governor of New Jersey Jon S. Corzine.

The Rothman Center is named for Mr. & Mrs. George Rothman, both of whom were generous benefactors to the university.

The Northeast Conference men's basketball tournament was held there three times.

See also
 List of NCAA Division I basketball arenas

References

External links 

Rothman Center, Fairleigh Dickinson University

Hackensack, New Jersey
College basketball venues in the United States
Fairleigh Dickinson Knights basketball
Indoor arenas in New Jersey
Sports venues in New Jersey
Basketball venues in New Jersey
Sports venues in Bergen County, New Jersey
1987 establishments in New Jersey
Sports venues completed in 1987
College volleyball venues in the United States
Indoor track and field venues in the United States
College indoor track and field venues in the United States
Fencing venues